Poovizhi Raja is a 1988 Indian Tamil-language film directed by Santhana Bharathi. The film stars Prabhu and Nishanti. It was released on 8 November 1988.

Plot 

A man asks the former managing director of his company to recommend his son for the position. But when he refuses, he resorts to unfair means.

Cast 
From the opening credits:
 Prabhu
 Ramki
 Nishanti
 Vijayakumar
 Vinu Chakravarthy
 Subha
 Shabnam

Production 
Poovizhi Raja was directed by Santhana Bharathi and produced by M. Gopi under S. M. Arts. The story was written by Shanmugasundaram. Cinematography was handled by A. Suresh Kumaar, and the editing by V. Rajagopal.

Soundtrack 
The soundtrack was composed by Yuvaraj.

References

External links 
 

1980s Tamil-language films
Films directed by Santhana Bharathi